The British Academy Television Award for Best Scripted Comedy is awarded annually as part of the British Academy Television Awards. Until 2015, the category was named the British Academy Television Award for Best Situation Comedy. According to British Academy of Film and Television Arts, the category "covers both situational comedies and scripted comedy sketch shows".

It was first awarded from 1973 to 1980, then from 1981 to 1999, sitcoms were included in the Best Comedy Programme or Series category. The category returned in 2000.

Winners and nominees

1973-1980

2000s

2010s

2020s

Note: The series that don't have recipients on the tables had Production team credited as recipients for the award or nomination.

Programmes with multiple wins and nominations

Multiple Awards

3 awards
The Office (consecutive)

2 awards
Black Books
Fawlty Towers
The Thick of It

Multiple Nominations

7 nominations
Peep Show
4 nominations
The IT Crowd
The Thick of It

3 nominations
The Office
The Royle Family
Stath Lets Flats
2 nominations
Black Books
Catastrophe
Chewing Gum
Derry Girls
Fleabag
Green Wing
Mrs. Brown's Boys
People Just Do Nothing
Rev.
Spaced
The Inbetweeners
The Vicar of Dibley

References

Scripted Comedy